A musical hoax (also musical forgery and musical mystification) is a piece of music composed by an individual who intentionally misattributes it to someone else.

Ascribed to historical figures 
 Henri Casadesus
 Viola Concerto in B minor by "George Frideric Handel"
 Viola Concerto in C minor by "Johann Christian Bach"
 Viola Concerto in D major by "Carl Philipp Emanuel Bach"
 Violin Concerto in D major by "Luigi Boccherini"
 Marius Casadesus
 Adélaïde Concerto by "Wolfgang Amadeus Mozart"
 Samuel Dushkin
 Grave for violin and orchestra by "Johann Georg Benda"
 Sicilienne for strings and clavier by "Maria Theresia von Paradis"
 François-Joseph Fétis
 Lute Concerto by "Valentin Strobel"
 Remo Giazotto
 Adagio in G minor by "Tomaso Giovanni Albinoni"
 Mikhail Goldstein
 Albumblatt (Листок из Альбома) by "Alexander Glazunov"
 Impromptu (Экспромт) by "Mily Balakirev"
 Viola Concerto in C major by "Ivan Khandoshkin"
 Arthur Hutchings
 "New works" by "Paul Hindemith", using the rhythms and dynamics of a Beethoven piano sonata with nonsensically wrong notes.
 Fritz Kreisler
 Allegretto by "Luigi Boccherini"
 Andantino by "Giovanni Battista Martini"
 Aubade Provençale by "Louis Couperin"
 Chanson Louis XIII and Pavane by "Louis Couperin"
 La Chasse (Caprice) by "Jean Baptiste Cartier"
 Grave by "Wilhelm Friedemann Bach"
 Menuett by "Nicola Porpora"
 Praeludium and Allegro by "Gaetano Pugnani"
 La Précieuse by "Louis Couperin"
 Preghiera by "Giovanni Battista Martini"
 Scherzo by "Carl Ditters von Dittersdorf"
 Sicilienne and Rigaudon by "François Francoeur"
 Study on a Choral by "Johann Stamitz"
 Tempo di Minuetto by "Gaetano Pugnani"
 Variations on a Theme by Corelli by "Giuseppe Tartini"
 Violin Concerto in C major by "Antonio Vivaldi"
 Winfried Michel
 Lost keyboard sonatas by "Joseph Haydn"
 Édouard Nanny
 Double Bass Concerto in A major by "Domenico Dragonetti"
 Siegfried Ochs
 Dank sei Dir, Herr by "George Frideric Handel"
 Alessandro Parisotti 
 "Se tu m'ami" by "Giovanni Battista Pergolesi"
 Manuel Ponce
 Suite in A minor by "Sylvius Leopold Weiss"
 Preamble & Gavotte by "Alessandro Scarlatti"
 Vladimir Vavilov 
 Ave Maria by Anonymous; The piece later received an unrelated  misattribution to Giulio Caccini.
 Elegy for guitar by "Mikhail Vyssotsky"
 Canzona for lute by "Francesco Canova da Milano"
 Mazurka in C minor for guitar by "Andrei Sychra"
 Nocturne in C minor for guitar by "Vassily Sarenko"
 Ricercar by "Niccolo Nigrino"

Ascribed to non-existent or purported historical individuals 
 Hans Keller and Susan Bradshaw
 Mobile for Tape and Percussion (1961) by "Piotr Zak"
 Mikhail Goldstein
 Symphony No. 21 by "Mykola Ovsianiko-Kulikovsky"
 Winfried Michel
 Chamber music by "Giovanni Paolo Simonetti"
 Roman Turovsky-Savchuk
 Works for baroque lute by Johann Joachim Sautscheck, Gotthold Ephraim Sautscheck, Konradin Aemilius Sautscheck, et al.
 Works for renaissance lute by Ioannes Leopolita and Jacobus Olevsiensis"
 Rohan Kriwaczek
 Works for solo violin, ascribed to various fictional English "funeral violinists".

References

External links 
 

 
Pseudepigraphy